Zhang Guangjun, may refer to:

 Zhang Guangjun (born 1965), a Chinese engineer and politician who is the current Vice Minister of Science and Technology, in office since November 2021. Previously he served as president of Southeast University.
 Zhang Guangjun (born 1975), a Chinese former judoka.